This is an incomplete list of ghost towns in Rhode Island.

 Hanton City
 Napatree Point
 Ramtail

References

Rhode Island
Ghost towns